Most Excellent Majesty is a form of address in the United Kingdom. It is mainly used in Acts of Parliament, where the phrase "the King's [Queen's] most Excellent Majesty" is used in the enacting clause.

The standard is as follows:

The phrase is also used in the enacting clause of appropriations acts of the Parliament of Canada, as illustrated in the following examples from the Appropriation Act No. 4, 2015–16:

See also
Forms of address in the United Kingdom
List of enacting clauses
Style of the British Sovereign

References

Style of the British sovereign
Superlatives